Guangzhou Yucai Middle School is a secondary school in Guangzhou, Guangdong, China. It was founded in 1951. With about 4,000 students, it is one of the largest secondary schools in the province.

History
Originally a primary school, Guangdong Yucai School was founded in 1951. It was the first school set up by the new People's Republic of China administration and the Communist Party of China in Canton. Intake was composed of mainly children of communist cadres from outside Guangdong. In 1954 it was relocated to Fujin Road. From 1961 onward, it transitioned into a middle school.

During the Cultural Revolution, it was renamed as Guangzhou No. 62 Middle School in 1968. In 1978, the school was split into two parts—the primary school and the high school. The primary school was named Meihuacun Primary School. In 1995, the high school was renamed as Guangzhou Yucai Middle School. On 10 December 2002, Guangzhou No. 48 Middle School was merged into Yucai.

Nearly 100% of Yucai's high school graduates attend college, with 24% admitted to national key universities. In 2008, Yucai's high school division was named one of the first national model high schools of Guangdong province.

See also 

 Education in Guangzhou

References

External links

Middle Schools in Guangzhou
1951 establishments in China
Educational institutions established in 1951
Yuexiu District